This is a list of domestic submarine communications cables and does not include international cable systems. All the cable systems listed below have landing points within one country, and are currently in-service. Several older cables, although no longer used for telecommunications, are used for scientific purposes. Others are simply abandoned.

A

 AFOS (Azores Fiber Optic System)
 Almeria-Melilla (Spain mainland interconnect to Melilla on the coast of Morocco)
 APOCS (Atlantic Provinces Optical Cable System) 
 APOCS 1B (Atlantic Provinces Optical Cable System)
 APOCS 1C (Atlantic Provinces Optical Cable System)
 APOCS 2 (Atlantic Provinces Optical Cable System)
 AUFS-EAST (Alaska United Fiber Optic Cable System)
 AUFS-WEST (Alaska United Fiber Optic Cable System)

B
 Bass Strait 1 (connects Australia mainland to Tasmania)
 Bass Strait 2 (connects Australia mainland to Tasmania)
 Beijing - Qingdao (Lingao) - (China)
 Brazil Domestic
 Bugio (Lisbon-Sesimbra interconnect)

C
 CAM-RING (Lisbon - Madeira - Azores, Portugal)
 CANDALTA (Candeleria - Alta Vista, Spain)
 CANI (Chennai - Andaman and Nicobar Islands)
 CC3 (Continent - Corsica 3) (Marseille - Ajaccio, France)
 CC4 (Continent - Corsica 4) (Cannes - Ile Rousse, France)
 CC5 (Continent - Corsica 5) (La Seyne - Ajaccio, France)
 CEIBA-1  (Equatorial Guinea, connects Bata - Malabo)
 Columbia Domestic Festoon
 Como Lake Festoon (Italy)
 Cook Strait Fibre Optic Cable (connects North and South Islands of New Zealand)

D
 DFON - (Domestic Fibre Optic Network) - Philippine Long Distance Telephone co. (Philippines)
 DDSCN - (Domestic Fibre Optic Network) - Dhiraagu Plc. (Maldives)

E

F
 FiberWeb (Ocean Fiber) - connecting oil rigs off the coast of Louisiana

G
 Germany Domestic
 Global West Network (California coastline from San Diego to San Francisco)
 GOPTIC (connects Sweden mainland with Gotland)
 Greece Domestic
 Guangdong-Hainan (China)
 Guangzhou-Haikou (China)
 Guangzhou-Shantou (China)
 Gulf of Mexico Festoon (Mexico)

H
 Hong Kong Domestic
 HICS (Hawaii Inter-Island Cable System)
 HYERES Festoon 1 (Giens - Porquerolles) - France
 HYERES Festoon 2 (Porquerolles - Port Cros) - France
 HYERES Festoon 3 (Heliopolis - Port Cros) - France
 HYERES Festoon 4 (Heliopolis - Le Lavandou) - France

I
 Iberian Festoon (Spain)
 IC-1 (Israeli Coasting 1) - (Israel)
 INDIGO-Central (Australia) - Perth to Sydney
 Italian Festoon
 (Ancona - Trieste)
 (Bari - Ancona)
 (Catania - Locri)
 (Catania - Bari)
 (Cefalu - Palermo)
 (Cetara - Vietri)
 (Civitavecchia - Giglio)
 (Civitavecchia - Pomezia)
 (Elba - Piombino)
 (Formia - Naples)
 (Genoa - Pisa)
 (Giglio - Maddalena)
 (Grosseto - Citavecchia)
 (Ischia - Procida)
 (Lamezia - Messina 1)
 (Lamezia - Messina 2)
 (Locri - Catanzaro)
 (Maddalena - Sassari)
 (Maiori - Cetara)
 (Massalubrense - Capri)
 (Mazara - Pantelleria)
 (Messina - Cefalu)
 (Miliscola - Procida)
 (Naples - Salerno)
 (Palermo - Rome)
 (Pisa - Grosseto)
 (Pomezia - Formia)
 (Positano - Praiano)
 (Praiano - Vettica)
 (Reggio Calabria - Catania)
 (Reggio Calabria - Gazzi 1)
 (Reggio Calabria - Gazzi 2)
 (Reggio Calabria - Gazzi 3)
 (Salerno - Scalea)
 (Scalea - Lamezia)
 (Venice - Ravenna)
 (Vettica - Maiori)
 GENSAR 2 - (Savona – Sassari)
 JANNA - (Olbia - Civitavecchia)
 JANNA 2 - (Cagliari - Mazara del Vallo)
 ROMSAR - (Pomezia - Golfo Aranci)
 ROMSAR 2 - (Rome - Sardinia)
 SARGEN - (Golfo Aranci-Genoa)
 SARSIC - (Golfo Aranci-Palermo)
 SARSIC 2 - (Cagliari-Palermo)

J
 Jakarta-Surabaya (SKKL-JS) (connects the two ends of the island)
 Japan Domestic
 JASUKA (Indonesia)
 JIH (Japan Information Highway)
 JRD-3 (Japan Reconfiguration and Digitization) - connects the Kanto Plain in southern Japan with Okinawa
 JAKA2LADEMA (Indonesia), connects Java, Kalimantan, Sulawesi, Bali, and Lombok islands.

K
 Korea Domestic
 KSL (Korean Southern Loop) link between Osan US Airbase and Kunsan US Airbase
 KINYRAS (Cyprus)
 Kuantan-Kota Kinabalu (Malaysia) link between Peninsular Malaysia and the Northwest coast of Borneo

L
 Lake Michigan Cable - connects Kewaunee, WI to Arcadia, MI (United States)
 Levin-Nelson (Cook Strait) Cable - connects North and South Islands of New Zealand
 LFON (Libyan Fibre Optic Network)

M
 Malaysian Domestic Submarine Cable System-North Link
 Malaysian Domestic Submarine Cable System-South Link
 Malaysian Festoon
 Maldives Domestic
 Mallorca-Menorca (Balearic Islands)
 MTC (Guam—Rota, Marianas—Tinian, Marianas—Saipan, Marianas)
 MKCS (Mataram Kupang Cable System, Indonesia), connects major cities in Nusa Tenggara, islands spread to the east of Bali.

N
 NDTN - (National Digital Transmission Network) - (Philippines) 
 NEPTUNE (North-East Pacific Time-Series Undersea Networked Experiments) - off the coast of Canada
 Nigeria Domestic
 Norway Domestic
 Novorossiysk-Sochi (Russian Black Sea Interconnect)

O
 OLERON (France mainland and Oleron Island connection)

P
 Palau Inter-Island System
 Palapa Ring (Indonesia)
 Pangkalpinang-Pontianak (Indonesia)
 PENBAL-1 (Barcelona - Palma) - (Spain)
 PENBAL-3 (Cabrera de Mar - Molina) - (Spain)
 PENBAL-4 (Valencia - Ibiza) - (Spain)
 PENBAL-5 (Gava - Ses Covetes) - (Spain)
 PENCAN-5 (Spain) (connects mainland Spain to Gran Canaria and Tenerife)
 PICOT (New Caledonia archipelago)

Q

R

S
 San Andrés Island-Providencia Island (Colombia)
 Sesimbra-Lagos (Portuguese Interconnect)
 Sochi-Poti (Russian Black Sea Interconnect)
 South Korea Domestic
 Sumatra-Java-Melaka (Indonesia)
 Svalbard Undersea Cable System - Mainland Norway to Svalbard Islands

T
 Taean-Chingdao (South Korea)
 TEFKROS (Cyprus)
 Thailand Domestic
 TM-1 (Taiwan)
 TT-1 - connects Trinidad to Tobago
 TURMEOS-1 (Turkey Marmara Aegean Optic System) - connects Izmir to Istanbul

U
UNSC-Unitel North Submarine Cable

V
 Venezuela Domestic Festoon
 (Cabimas - Maracaibo)
 (Maracaibo - Punto Fijo)
 (Punto Fijo - Coro)
 (Coro - Chichiriviche)
 (Chichiriviche - Puerto Cabello)
 (Puerto Cabello - Camuri)
 (Camuri - Higuerote)
 (Higuerote - Puerto La Cruz)
 (Puerto La Cruz - Cumana)
 (Cumana - Porlamar)
 (Porlamar - Carupano)

W
 WCI CABLE (Alaska - Oregon)
 Wellington Harbour Link (Wellington, New Zealand)

X

Y

Z
ZanLink - (Tanzania)

References

External links
 GCI's AUFS Alaska United Fiber-optic cable System
 AT&T Alascom
 WCI Cable - AFS Alaska Fiber Star - Northstar cable
 Neptune - University of Victoria, British Columbia, Canada
 Alcatel-Lucent Reference List
  The International Cable Protection Committee—includes a register of submarine cables worldwide
 Comprehensive list of cable landing sites globally
 Structured cabling
 Global Communications Submarine Cable Map, 2007
 Kingfisher Information Service—source of free maps of cable routes around the UK
 France Telecom's Fishermen's/Submarine Cable Information
 List of the suppliers of the world's undersea communications cables
 Timeline of Submarine Cables, 1850-2007
 Region Sardinia network infrastructures for public administrations and research centers
 Mediterranean, Red Sea and Black Sea Database Page

Coastal construction